Hans Sahl (born Hans Salomon, 20 May 1902 in Dresden – 27 April 1993 in Tübingen) was a poet, critic, and novelist who began during the Weimar Republic. He came from an affluent Jewish background, but like many such German Jews he fled Germany due to the Nazis. First to Czechoslovakia in 1933, then to Switzerland, and then France. In France he was interned along with Walter Benjamin. He would later flee Marseille and work with Varian Fry to help other artists or intellectuals fleeing Nazism. From 1941, he lived in New York. In 1952, Sahl became an American citizen. He became known as one of the anti-fascist exiles and in the US translated Arthur Miller, Thornton Wilder, and Tennessee Williams into German. In 1989, he returned to Germany.

Awards
 1962 Member of the Deutsche Akademie für Sprache und Dichtung
 1982 Commander's Cross of the Order of Merit of the Federal Republic of Germany
1984 Andreas Gryphius Prize
1991 Goethe Medal
1993 Carl Zuckmayer Medal
1993 Lessing Prize of the Free State of Saxony

References

External links

German literary critics
German film critics
Jewish emigrants from Nazi Germany to France
Writers from Dresden
Commanders Crosses of the Order of Merit of the Federal Republic of Germany
1902 births
1993 deaths
20th-century German poets
German male poets
20th-century German male writers
German male non-fiction writers